A Bulgarian passport is an international travel document issued to nationals of Bulgaria, and may also serve as proof of Bulgarian citizenship. Besides enabling the bearer to travel internationally and serving as indication of Bulgarian citizenship, the passport facilitates the process of securing assistance from Bulgarian consular officials abroad or other European Union member states in case a Bulgarian consular is absent, if needed.

As of 10 January 2023 Bulgarian citizens have visa-free or visa on arrival access to 174 countries and territories, ranking the Bulgarian passport 18th overall in terms of travel freedom according to the Henley & Partners Passport Index. Bulgarian citizens can live and work in any country within the EU as a result of the right of free movement and residence granted in Article 21 of the EU Treaty.

Every Bulgarian citizen is also a citizen of the European Union. The passport, along with the national identity card allows for free rights of movement and residence, establishment and employment in any of the states of the European Union and EFTA.

Application
The Ministry of Interior is responsible for the issuing and renewing of Bulgarian passports.

Use

For travel within the European Union, Schengen Area as well as to Albania, Bosnia and Herzegovina, Georgia, Kosovo, Moldova, Montenegro, North Macedonia, North Cyprus, Serbia and Turkey Bulgarian citizens are not required to carry a passport and only need a valid national identity cards.

A Bulgarian passport gives its bearer the right to assistance and protection by Bulgarian diplomatic missions and consular offices abroad (or to those of other EU member states when there is no Bulgarian diplomatic mission or consulate in the destination country or territory).

The passport remains the property of the Republic of Bulgaria.

Categories

 Regular – available to all Bulgarian citizens and valid for five or ten years.
 Service – issued to their staff on request by the respective government agency or directorate.
 Diplomatic – issued to diplomats, high-ranking state officials and their immediate families.

Physical appearance

Bulgarian passports are of the common EU design, burgundy in color, with the Bulgarian Coat of arms emblazoned in the center of the front cover. The text "Европейски съюз" (Bulgarian) / "European Union" (English), the country's official long name "Република България" (Bulgarian) and the English form "Republic of Bulgaria" are inscribed in capital letters above the coat of arms, with the word "паспорт" (Bulgarian) / "passport" (English) underneath. It is issued for a period of five or ten years, and contains 32 or 48 pages.

Security features include holographic images, micro printing, UV-visible features, watermarks, etc. In addition, the passport holder's photograph is digitally printed directly onto the paper, in standard ink as well as a holographic image. All passports are machine-readable.

Biometric passports
Since 29 March 2010, all newly issued Bulgarian passports contain a chip with biometric data, and also feature the text "Европейски съюз" (Bulgarian) / "European Union" (English) above the country's official name, thus reflecting Bulgaria's EU membership. Additional design changes include the placement of pictures of famous Bulgarian landmarks and monuments on the inside pages of the passports. The new passport fees are €20 (40 BGN).

Passport note
The passports contain a note from the issuing state that is addressed to the authorities of all other states, identifying the bearer as a citizen of that state and requesting that he or she be allowed to pass and be treated according to international norms. The note inside Bulgarian passports states:

Languages

The data page/information page is printed in Bulgarian, English and French.

Visa requirements

As of 19 July 2022, Bulgarian citizens have visa-free or visa on arrival access to 173 countries and territories, ranking the Bulgarian passport 17th overall in terms of travel freedom according to the Henley & Partners Passport Index.

Visitor statistics 
According to the National Statistical Institute of Bulgaria, these were the top 10 destination countries for Bulgarians:

Gallery of historic images

See also

Bulgarian identity card
Bulgarian nationality law
Citizenship of the European Union
Driving licence in Bulgaria
Foreign relations of Bulgaria
Passports of the European Union
Unique citizenship number
Visa policy of the Schengen Area
Visa requirements for Bulgarian citizens
List of diplomatic missions of Bulgaria
List of passports

References

External links

Official passport renewal website of the Bulgarian Embassy in the United States
Republic of Bulgaria : International Passport (2000–2005) from PaperToTravel.com collection

Passports by country
Passport
European Union passports